Saba senegalensis, known as weda in the Moore, French, and English languages, is a fruit-producing plant of the Apocynaceae family, native to the Sahel region of sub-Saharan Africa.  It has several common names in various West African Languages. The tree grows predominantly on riverbanks and in woodlands in The Gambia, Guinea-Bissau, Burkina Faso, Senegal, Somalia, Mali and Ivory Coast.  It has been observed growing as vine up trees, as a small erect shrub, and oftentimes growing to the size of a large tree.

ICRISAT has cited S. senegalensis as a useful food crop plant and as a tool to combat soil degradation in rural Africa.

Fruit 
The fruit of Saba senegalensis has a hard yellow peel containing large seeds embedded in a yellowish pulp, having a pleasing acidity similar to that of the tamarind. The flavour has also been compared with that of a mango or a lemon.

Drink 
Natives of the Sahel region often use the fruit to make a juice.

Propagation 
Saba senegalensis is most easily propagated through seeds. Once you acquire seeds, soak them in warm water for 24 hours. Then, start seeds directly in cactus soil mix. Do not overwater. The seeds should sprout within 2–4 weeks. Alternatively, if you have access to a live plant, it can by propagated by use of cuttings. Simply cut a 6-12 inch branch from the plant, and start directly in soil. The plant should fruit within 2–5 years of being planted.

Growing 
Saba senegalensis will grow best outdoors in USDA zones 10 and warmer. If you live in a colder zone, you may have success growing it in a pot and bringing it indoors for winter.

Common names 

 In the Moore language: "Weda"
 In the Wolof language: "Madd"
 In Mandinka: "Kabaa"
 In the Bambara language: "Zaban"
 In the French language: "Liane saba"
 In Côte d'Ivoire: "Saba"
 In Sierra Leone Krio: "Malombo"
 In the Congo basin:  "Malombo" or "Makalakonki"
 In Guinea Bissau, Kriolu language: "Foli lifanti"
 In Casamance, Senegal, Joola language: "Kuguissai"
In Northern Nigeria, Hausa language: "Chiyo"
 In Somali: "Dhangalow"
 In Nigeria, Ibo language: "Utu"

References

External links

Rauvolfioideae
Tropical fruit
Flora of Africa
Flora of Mali
Fruits originating in Africa
Plants described in 1844